is a railway station in Mooka, Tochigi Prefecture, Japan, operated by the Mooka Railway.

Lines
Kugeta Station is a station on the Mooka Line, and is located 8.5 rail kilometers from the terminus of the line at Shimodate Station.

Station layout
Kugeta Station has two side platforms.

History
Kugeta Station opened on 1 April 1912 as a station on the Japanese Government Railway, which subsequently became the Japanese National Railways (JNR). The station was absorbed into the JR East network upon the privatization of the JNR on 1 April 1987, and the Mooka Railway from 11 April 1988.

Surrounding area
Japan National Route 294
Former Kugeta Town Hall
Kugeta Post Office

References

External links

 Mooka Railway Station information 

Railway stations in Tochigi Prefecture
Railway stations in Japan opened in 1912
Mooka, Tochigi